As a metropolitan area of about 30 million people, Jakarta has a variety of transport systems. Jakarta was awarded 2021 global Sustainable Transport Award (STA) for integrated public transportation system.

The city prioritized development of road networks, which were mostly designed to accommodate private vehicles. A notable feature of Jakarta's present road system is the toll road network. Composed of an inner and outer ring road and five toll roads radiating outwards, the network provides inner as well as outer city connections. An 'odd-even' policy limits road use to cars with either odd or even-numbered registration plates on a particular day as a transitional measure to alleviate traffic congestion until the future introduction of electronic road pricing.

There are many bus terminals in the city, from where buses operate on numerous routes to connect neighborhoods within the city limit, to other areas of Greater Jakarta and to cities across the island of Java. The biggest of the bus terminal is Pulo Gebang Bus Terminal, which is arguably the largest of its kind in Southeast Asia. High-speed railways being constructed connecting Jakarta to Bandung and another one is at planning stage from Jakarta to Surabaya.

As of September 2022, Jakarta's public transport service coverage has reached 86 percent, which is targeted to Increase to 95 percent. Rapid transit in Greater Jakarta consists of TransJakarta bus rapid transit, Jakarta LRT, Jakarta MRT, Greater Jakarta Commuter Rail, and Soekarno-Hatta Airport Rail Link. Another transit system Greater Jakarta LRT is expected to be operational by July 2023. The city administration is building transit oriented development like Dukuh Atas TOD and CSW-ASEAN TOD in several area across Jakarta to facilitate commuters to transfer between different mode of public transportation.

Privately owned bus systems like Kopaja, MetroMini, Mayasari Bakti and PPD also provide important services for Jakarta commuters with numerous routes throughout the city. Pedicabs are banned from the city for causing traffic congestion. Bajaj auto rickshaw provide local transportation in the back streets of some parts of the city. Angkot microbuses also play a major role in road transport of Jakarta. Taxicabs and ojeks (motorcycle taxis) are available in the city. As of January 2023, about 2.6 million people use public transportation daily in Jakarta.

The city administration has undertaken a project to build about 500 kilometers of bicycle lanes. As of June 2021, Jakarta already has 63 kilometers of bicycle lanes, and another 101 kilometers will be added by the end of the year 2021.

Soekarno–Hatta International Airport (CGK) is the main airport serving the Greater Jakarta area, while Halim Perdanakusuma Airport (HLP) accommodates private and low-cost domestic flights. Other airports in the Jakarta metropolitan area include Pondok Cabe Airport and an airfield on Pulau Panjang, part of the Thousand Island archipelago.

Indonesia's busiest and Jakarta's main seaport Tanjung Priok serves many ferry connections to different parts of Indonesia. The old port Sunda Kelapa only accommodate pinisi, a traditional two-masted wooden sailing ship serving inter-island freight service in the archipelago. Muara Angke is used as a public port to Thousand Islands (Indonesia), while Marina Ancol is used as a tourist port.

Usage shares

As of 2015, about 1.4 million commuters travel into the city center from the outskirts of Jakarta. Based on the survey, 58 percent of these commuters use motorcycles, 12.8 percent use cars and only 27 percent use public transportation. In 2004, a study was undertaken to prepare a master plan for an integrated public transport system within Greater Jakarta, which revealed the mode of transport among city dwellers. The city's 9.5% average annual growth rate of motorized vehicles far exceeds the 0.01% increase in road length between 2005 and 2010. As of 2010, public transportation in Jakarta serves only 56% of commuter trips.

Road transport

Streets and highways

During the Dutch colonial era, a structured road network connecting most major cities throughout Java was developed as a part of the Java Great Post Road by former Governor-General H.W. Daendels. The network was built in the early 19th century, and although the network was later expanded to a great extent, it could not keep up with the rapidly increasing numbers of motorized vehicles, resulting in highly congested traffic. The city prioritized development of road networks, which were mostly designed to accommodate private vehicles.

A notable feature of Jakarta's present road system is the toll road network. Composed of an inner and outer ring road and six toll roads radiating outwards, the network provides inner as well as outer city connections. Jakarta Outer Ring Road 2 is an under-construction toll road encircling greater Jakarta area, parallel with Jakarta Outer Ring Road (JORR 1).

The six radiating toll roads are:
Prof. Dr. Ir. Soedijatmo Toll Road linking to Soekarno–Hatta International Airport
Jakarta–Tangerang Toll Road linking to Tangerang and further to Merak in the west
Jakarta–Serpong Toll Road linking to Serpong
Depok-Antasari Toll Road linking to Depok and planned to go further to Bogor
Jagorawi Toll Road linking to Bogor and Ciawi in the south
Jakarta–Cikampek Toll Road linking to Bekasi and Cikampek in the east

The city's 9.5% average annual growth rate of motorized vehicles far exceeded the 0.01% increase in road length between 2005 and 2010. In 2018, over 13 million motorcycles and 4.4 million cars used the roads of Jakarta.
In 2019, there were about 88 million movements per day in the Greater Jakarta area, and public transportation accounts for only 30% of commuter trips. According to the National Development Planning Agency (Bappenas) traffic congestion in Greater Jakarta causes a waste of about $7.4 billion each year.

Throughout the years, several attempts have been made to reduce traffic congestion on Jakarta's main arteries. Implemented solutions include a 'three-in-one' rush-hour law, during which cars with fewer than three passengers are prohibited from driving on the main avenues. However, "car jockeys" were paid by commuters to ride into the center of the city to permit the use of three-in-one roads. Another example is the ban on trucks passing main avenues during the day. In 2016, 'odd-even' policy was introduced which designated cars with either odd or even-numbered registration plates on a particular day. This aims to function as a transitional measure to alleviate traffic congestion until the future introduction of Electronic Road Pricing which would be more effective.

Due to the city's acute gridlock, the Jakarta administration has decided to implement Electronic Road Pricing in 10 districts: Tanah Abang, Menteng, Setiabudi, Tebet, Matraman, Senen, Gambir, Tambora, Sawah Besar and Taman Sari. The ERP is planned to be implemented in the three-in-one zone and along Jl. Rasuna Said. The ERP system is expected to be operational by 2019 along with the opening of the Jakarta MRT. Implementation of the ERP system is planned to take place in two phases; the first will be for vehicles moving from the Senayan traffic circle to the Hotel Indonesia traffic circle while the second will be installed from the HI traffic circle to Jl. Medan Merdeka Barat.

Bus service

There are many bus terminals in the city, from where buses operate on numerous routes to connect neighborhoods within the city limit, to other areas of Greater Jakarta area and to cities across the island of Java. The biggest of the bus terminal is Pulo Gebang Bus Terminal, which is arguably the largest of its kind in Southeast Asia. Besides TransJakarta, other private owned bus systems like Kopaja, MetroMini, Mayasari Bakti and PPD also provide important services for Jakarta commuters with numerous routes throughout the city. Since January 2013, Jakarta Government has integrated Kopaja AC buses with TransJakarta feeder bus routes. For the future, Metromini AC bus it is also possible to enter TransJakarta bus lanes to enhance integrated bus rapid transit system.

Traditional transports

In 1966, an estimated 160 thousand pedicabs (becak) operated in the city; as much as 15% of Jakarta's total workforce was engaged in becak driving. In 1971, becaks were banned from major roads, and shortly thereafter the government attempted a total ban, which substantially reduced their numbers but did not eliminate them. A campaign to eliminate them succeeded in 1990 and 1991, but during the economic crisis of 1998, some returned amid less effective government attempts to control them. Becaks were banned because they caused traffic congestion and they were seen as the exploitation of humans by other humans. Becaks were replaced by bemo, betor, helicak, minicar, and bajaj. In 2018, Governor Anies Baswedan attempted to allow becaks again because of a political contract with becak drivers during his campaign. Most cycle rickshaw drivers in the 1980s were former landless agricultural laborers from rural areas of Java. , there are about 1,500 becaks in Jakarta.

Bajaj auto rickshaw provide local transportation in the back streets of some parts of the city. From the early 1940s to 1991 they were a common form of local transportation in the city. They are colored blue (for the ones which use Compressed natural gas) and orange (for the ones which use normal gasoline fuel). The blue ones are imported from India with the brand of Bajaj and TVS and the orange ones are the old design from 1990. The government is currently replacing the orange bajajs with the blue ones because blue bajajs are less polluting and the gas fuel is cheaper. Bemo was a three-wheeled vehicle similar to bajaj, which were eliminated in 1996 because they were old, too dangerous and cause much pollution, but they continued to exist until recently, when in 2017, Bajaj Qute was introduced to replace bemo. Angkot microbuses also play a major role in road transport of Jakarta. They operates in numerous routes to connect neighborhoods of the city.

Taxi cab

Plenty of taxi cabs are available in the city. Many companies operate & maintain pools of different model of cars in their own brands. Go-Jek and Grab also have wide presence. Vehicle for hire companies accessible by mobile apps, known in Indonesia as taksi online (online taxi), has reduced the number of conventional taxi companies operating in Jakarta from 32 to 4 (Blue Bird, Express, Gamya, and Taxiku).

Motorcycle taxi/ojek

Although ojek are not an official form of public transport, they can be found throughout Indonesia and in Jakarta. They are especially useful when navigating crowded urban roads, narrow alleyways, heavy traffic and cramped locations that larger vehicles cannot reach. Most of the ojeks are operated by Gojek and Grab, in Indonesia called ojek online. Gojek was founded in 2011 so that ojek drivers who had been working with unpredictable income could operate professionally with better income, and its app was created in 2015.

Bicycle

There are bicycle taxis (ojek sepeda ontel) in the Kota Tua (Old City) region. However, the revenues are declining because of the popularity of ojek online. As of November 2019, Jakarta has 63 kilometers of separate bicycle lane, which will be extended to 200 kilometers by 2020. Bicycle-sharing company Gowes, which means "to paddle," in Indonesian, started operation in limited areas of Jakarta in 2018.

Intercity Rail

Long-distance railways and local tram services were first introduced during the Dutch colonial era. While the trams were replaced with buses in the post-colonial era, long-distance railways continued to connect the city to its neighboring regions as well as cities throughout the island of Java. High-speed railways are planned connecting Jakarta-Bandung and Jakarta-Surabaya.

High speed rail 

The first high-speed rail to connect Jakarta with Bandung is currently under construction which is expected to start operation in 2021. The contract was awarded to China. Both Japan and China contested as a potential contractor, but it was awarded to China mainly because of their proposal did not require Indonesian fiscal spending or government debt guarantees. The project cost was estimated to be US$5.5 billion. China Development Bank will fund 75 percent of the project. A joint venture company  PT Kereta Cepat Indonesia-China has formed by China Railway Group Limited (CREC) with a consortium of Indonesia's state-owned enterprises (SOEs) led by PT Wijaya Karya Tbk to develop the project.

Another project to upgrade of existing Jakarta-Surabaya route to high speed rail is undertaken in 2016. Priority was given to Japan this time who had been one of the biggest investors to Indonesia. The route is supposed to finish construction in 2019.

Rapid transit
At present rapid transit in Greater Jakarta consists of a BRT TransJakarta, the Jakarta MRT, Jakarta LRT, the Greater Jakarta Commuter Rail and Soekarno-Hatta Airport Rail Link. Other transit system being under construction is the Jabodebek LRT and the Jakarta-Bandung HSR.

Bus rapid transit

TransJakarta bus rapid transit service (known as Busway) was developed in the context of development reforms (or reformasi) and used Bogota's TransMilenio system as a model. Jakarta's first busway line, from Blok M to  opened in January 2004 and as of 14 February 2013, twelve out of fifteen corridors are in use. TransJakarta has the world's longest bus rapid transit routes ( in length). TransJakarta had a total of 128 routes as of April 2018 (corridor, cross route & feeder route) - a significant increase from 41 routes in 2015. TransJakarta has targeted to serve one million passengers per day by the end of 2018. In addition there are 18 'feeder' routes that serve beyond the exclusive busway corridors. Located in the municipalities surrounding Jakarta, the feeder service uses special buses that allow for boarding at either ground level or the TransJakarta station platforms. Transjakarta owned more than 1,500 buses in the first three months of 2017 and targets to have 3,000 buses by the end of the year.

Greater Jakarta Commuter rail

Greater Jakarta Commuter Rail or commonly known as Commuterline is a commuter rail system which serves commuters in Jakarta, Bogor, Depok, Tangerang, South Tangerang, and Bekasi. The commuter system was started in 2000. The number of passengers in 2014 reached 208 million, rising from 158 million in the previous year. Commuter Line serves all municipalities in Jakarta excluding the Thousand Islands, as well as Greater Jakarta region. The rail system uses rolling stock of rapid transit standard and operates at high frequency with a minimum headway. The average daily ridership was about 0.95 million with a total of 315.8 million commuters used Commuter LineL Jabodetabek in the year 2017.

As a transit station, Manggarai railway station is the busiest station in Indonesia, with more than 100,000 passengers boarding and alighting each day. Though during rush hours, the number of passengers greatly exceeds the system's capacity, and crowding is common.

Jakarta MRT

After a long planning and years of delay, Jakarta Mass Rapid Transit is currently in service. Jakarta city government decided for a rail-based system because of its ability to carry large numbers of people quickly and cheaply. Jakarta MRT has a North–South line between Kota and Lebak Bulus and an East–West line. Preparation work started in April 2012, and groundbreaking was done in October 2013.

Jakarta LRT

Jakarta LRT is a light metro system currently under construction. Eight two-cars trainsets were procured.

Greater Jakarta LRT

Greater Jakarta LRT (LRT Jabodebek) is a light rapid transit system which is currently under construction. The light rail transit (LRT) project was launched to replace the previously abandoned monorail project.

Airport rail link

Air

Soekarno–Hatta International Airport (CGK) is the main airport serving the Greater Jakarta area. The airport is named after the first President of Indonesia, Soekarno, and the first Vice President of Indonesia, Mohammad Hatta. The airport is often called Cengkareng airport or Soetta by Indonesians. The airport's IATA code, CGK, originates from the name of the Cengkareng locality, Tangerang, Banten, although the location of this airport is located outside of the city, it is used as a gate out by the Jakartans and citizen of the surrounding areas, therefore at the main gate of the airport, there is an inscription "Jakarta Airports". Soekarno–Hatta International Airport was ranked as 17th busiest airport in the world by Airports Council International, with about 63 million passengers in 2017. Today the airport is running over capacity. After T3 Soekarno-Hatta Airport expansion has finished in May 2016, the total capacity of three terminals become 43 million passengers a year. T1 and T2 also will be revitalized, so all the three terminals finally will accommodate 67 million passengers a year.

A second airport, Halim Perdanakusuma Airport (HLP) serves domestic flight of low-cost airline, private and VIP/presidential flights. Other airports in the Jakarta metropolitan area include Pondok Cabe Airport and an airfield on Pulau Panjang, part of the Thousand Island archipelago (Kepulauan Seribu).

Waterway

Sea
Jakarta's main seaport Port of Tanjung Priok serves many ferry connections to different parts of Indonesia. Port of Tanjung Priok is Indonesia's busiest port, and the 21st busiest port in the world in 2013, handling over 6.59 million TEUs. To boost the port capacity, two-phase "New Tanjung Priok" extension project is currently ongoing. When fully operational in 2023, it will triple existing annual capacity.

The port is also an important employer in the area, with more than 18,000 employees who provide services to more than 18,000 ships every year.

Muara Angke Port is used as a public port to Thousand Islands. In December 2011, Muara Angke Port was renovated for Rp 130 billion ($14.4 million) in a 3 hectare area. The port serves three water transport routes as of 2020:

Another ports in Jakarta include the old port of Sunda Kelapa and Marina Ancol Port. Sunda Kelapa Port only accommodate pinisi, a traditional two masted wooden sailing ship serving inter-island freight service in the archipelago. Marina Ancol Port is used as a tourist port, serves speed boat routes to various islands across Thousand Islands.

River
On 6 June 2007, the city administration introduced the Waterway (officially Angkutan Sungai), a new river boat service along the Ciliwung River. Due to varying water levels during the dry and wet seasons in addition to heavy water pollution that comes with water from upstream during rain, the service was closed.

See also

 Transport in Indonesia

References